Agnes Jebet Ngetich (born January 23, 2001) is a Kenyan long-distance runner. She won two medals at the 2023 World Cross Country Championships with bronze in the senior women's race and team gold.

Career
In March 2019, 18-year-old Agnes Jebet Ngetich won the 5000 metres at the Kenya African Under-20 Trials.

She finished fifth at the Kenyan Cross Country Championships that were held at the Iten Grounds in Elgeyo Marakwet County in November 2021.

In September 2022, Ngetich finished runner-up to Sheila Chepkirui at the Brasov Running Festival 10 km road race in Brașov, Romania.

On 18 February 2023, the 22-year-old won the bronze medal in the individual race and gold in the team standings at the World Cross Country Championships held in Bathurst, Australia.

Personal bests
 5000 metres – 15:07.34 (Nairobi 2021)
Road
 5 kilometres – 15:02 (Herzogenaurach 2021)
 10 kilometres – 30:30 (Brașov 2022)

References

External links
 World Athletics profile

Living people
2001 births
Kenyan female cross country runners
Kenyan female long-distance runners
21st-century Kenyan women 
World Athletics Cross Country Championships winners